Robert Boury (born December 28, 1946) is an American composer and pianist. Boury was part of the revival of Ragtime led by William Albright and William Bolcom in the late sixties. Boury has composed many types of instrumental works and in a variety of medias and genres, such as solo/duet piano works, art songs, both comic opera/opera seria, choral works, ragtime works, orchestral works and elect acoustic pieces.

As a professor of music and resident composer at the University of Arkansas at Little Rock, he is an active musician and a devoted teacher, who hosts a "Songwriters Showcase" for his students each semester. Boury's commissioned work, To Dream Again, which contains four songs from Shakespeare's The Tempest, was given its first performance in the summer of 2003 at the 100th Anniversary Convention of Sigma Alpha Iota, in Dearborn, Michigan. In 2004, his university commissioned him to create a work in honor of the opening of the Clinton Library in Little Rock and he continues to volunteer in schools and churches to share his music. Boury has composed music for his university's alma mater, as well as for opera and theater events, produced at University of Arkansas at Little Rock. His many art songs and chamber music pieces have been performed regionally, nationally and internationally as well. Robert Boury is known for his beautiful art songs and cycles. His renowned songs are well thought of and are sung by students and professionals nationwide. Boury also composed many solo piano pieces along with piano ensemble works such as two pianos, four hands pieces (Two Beguines, op. 4, Duelin' Pianos, op. 10d) and one piano, eight hands piece (The Mice Will Play, op. 19).

Like many composers before him, Boury was influenced by different eras and musical styles. Having been born in the middle of the 20th century, he was exposed to a variety of compositional styles. His works combine elements of tonal and non-tonal classical music with a touch of American music and non-Western music. For instance, some of his piano works exhibit a Romantic style while others consist of Rag style influences. His recent piano works show his interest in a Medieval compositional technique called soggetto cavato (Italian: Carved-out subject), which is an innovation that Renaissance composer Josquin des Prez used. In this technique, the vowels of words are transformed into a musical theme by matching them to the corresponding pitches. The details of his compositional styles will be discussed later in this document, along with his piano solo pieces. His solo piano pieces are also listed in chronological order.

Despite the fact that Boury is a well-established composer, it appears that no written analyses of his piano works exist. His piano works indicate that Boury has absorbed a number of influences, for instance J. S. Bach, Chopin, Debussy, Ross Lee Finney. The variety of styles in Boury's piano pieces reveal music history itself in that they connect to the music of an earlier age, such as Renaissance and Baroque eras to Romantic, and Contemporary eras. This characteristic is crucial to the understanding and appreciation of Boury's style/compositions, and is in need of research and analysis for those who desire to explore Boury's piano works.

Life

Biographical background
Robert Wade Boury was born in Wheeling, West Virginia, in 1946. His father, Michael Boury, and uncles operated the Elby's restaurant chain, Michael managing the commissary, while Boury's mother, Pearl Mickey, was a stay at home mother. He describes his father as the master of "money and business" and narrates that his father was always bringing home new food recipes to try out on Boury, mother, and sister. He remembers his mother as "a good pianist with wonderful touch in her piano playing". However, she turned down a full scholarship to the Cincinnati Conservatory to get married. Even though she chose to be a wife and mother, she kept playing the piano for Boury and his sister every day. He describes her sound as follows: "My mother had the most beautiful touch of anyone I've ever heard up close. She only taught me by example. I've been trying to recreate it ever since."

Boury was influenced by his mother's beautiful piano playing and later began his piano study at age ten with Dorothy Ackerman Zoeckler. She was a student of Robert Goldsand at the Manhattan School of Music, who was also an author, a published composer, and a member of The National League of American Pen Women. She recognized Boury's talent in music and encouraged him to explore not just music, but also poetry and art. Boury took piano lessons and composition lessons from Ackerman for seven years. He talks about memories of his early musical study with her: "... she had books on Art and Literature that we, her students could take home. I would go to her house every day after school and sight-read downstairs where parents and students waited for their lesson—hoping for a cancellation so I could have an extra lesson."
She sensed that my brain was growing faster than my technique so she gave me a set of Rossini Overtures conducted on 78s by Arturo Toscanni ... I had no idea there was such beauty in the world. The music was poignant and funny, traits I would continue to cherish in music. I determined that day, not to become a performer of such music but rather to compose music like that.

Teachers and influences

In 1964, Boury continued further music education at Manhattan School of Music where he studied with David Diamond in the junior level composition class. Boury still remembers what Diamond said in the class: "... you can write anything you want, so long as it's a fugue."

David Diamond (born 1915 – died 2005) studied composition with Bernard Rogers and Roger Sessions. He met Maurice Ravel in 1928, and took Ravel's suggestion to study with Nadia Boulanger who taught Diamond counterpoint predominantly. In 1937, Diamond had an opportunity to receive tutorial instruction from Stravinsky in Paris. Diamond's works are characterized as a complex polyphonic approach with strong rhythmic pattern and seemingly innate formal logic. Boury followed Diamond's instructions during his study with him and wrote a song cycle which contains three movements in fugal style. Diamond believed that counterpoint study would make music pour out of his students after that work was done.

When Boury was in his senior year at Manhattan School of Music, he enrolled in private lessons with Mario Davidovsky. Mario Davidovsky came originally from Argentina, and immigrated to the United States. Davidovsky's composition study began at age thirteen under , and later with Aaron Copland, who was not interested in electronic music. Despite Copland's preference to the contrary, Davidovsky continued composing electronic music. With Milton Babbitt's encouragement, Davidovsky specialized in live-electronic mixtures in which he explored the possibilities of dialogues between taped music and various performing forces, ranging from a single instrument to full orchestra and chorus.  Boury respected Davidovsky musical style and him as a great pedagogue, as a result Boury took Davidovsky's advice to apply to the University of Michigan for graduate school.

Born in Minnesota State, Ross Lee Finney (born on 1906 – died 1997) was another teacher who also influenced Boury while he was at the University of Michigan. Finney was exposed to piano and cello at young age, and by age twelve he was performing in small communities in the Midwest. He studied with Nadia Boulanger, Edward Burlingame Hill, Alban Berg and Roger Sessions. His style has a wide range from Romantic style, twelve tone, American/Midwestern roots to complex serial techniques. In the fall of 1968, Boury enrolled in the School of Music at the University of Michigan for his graduate degree. He mentions that he was influenced a great deal by just being around Finney and his Second Viennese School works. The inspiration led Boury to compose an orchestra piece "Summer Music 1968", which amazed his Music Theory teacher, Richmond Browne, who asked Boury how he could know so much about Vienna in 1935.

While Boury was a graduate student at the University of Michigan, he also received instruction from Leslie Bassett, who studied with Arthur Honegger, a member of Les Six. Bassett also studied Roberto Gerhard, Mario Davidovsky, Ross Lee Finney and Nadia Boulanger. Many of Bassett's works are very short, ranging from two minutes to twenty-eight minutes. They are clearly constructed and convey a strong spiritual content. Bassett used conventional pitch materials within his unique manner.

Bassett taught Composition Seminar and Private Composition courses at the graduate level at the University of Michigan. Boury describes the time studying with Bassett as follows: "... Mr. Bassett was and is a master orchestral thinker. My lessons with him were largely quiet affairs, him looking for about a half an hour at a page of 30 line full score, then saying, 'Aren't the trombones a little high?' Seemed like nothing was happening—yet I look at my own instrumental music and have to say, it looks like Bassett. Very clean, not many doublings..."

Bassett remembers Boury as "... a good man and an interesting composer, dedicated to music and working hard...."

Musical career

Boury served as a teaching fellow at University of Michigan while he was pursuing his Doctor of Musical Arts degree (D.M.A.). After Boury graduated from the University of Michigan he took a break from teaching and moved to Indianapolis. There, he worked in a sixteen track studio called "Tape Masters" as a jingle writer as well as a documentary film scores writer. He later held a job at Capitol Records in Los Angeles to produce lead sheets, song transcriptions before returning to his hometown in Wheeling, West Virginia, to open a piano/composition studio.

In 1977, Boury moved to Lansing, Michigan, after Lansing Community College invited him to create a new music program for an Associate degree. This new degree program consisted of Pop Rock Bands, Pop Rock Voice, Pop Rock Keyboard and Pop Rock Guitar, Business in Music along with Boury's courses, three levels of Pop Rock Theory and Songwriting courses. This new degree program attracted nationwide attention and enhanced enrollment at Lansing Community College. Boury mentioned that the experience at Lansing Community College changed his life tremendously as well as the career opportunity that led him to be at the current position at the University of Arkansas at Little Rock.

Boury joined University of Arkansas in 1981 as a resident composer and a professor of music theory and composition. He teaches courses such as; Analyses, Songwriting, as well as private sessions, which he enjoys. Boury also hosts a Songwriters Showcase for his students every semester. He believes that this event is a great opportunity for his students to present their works as composers. Students are asked to find other musicians to perform in the event rather than playing their own composition projects. When Boury was asked for the reason, he said that those students are all composers and should attend as a composer, not as a performer. Later when the author requested to know about his philosophy of teaching, Boury said, "A friend of mine challenged me to create a philosophy of Teaching in six words. Mine is, 'I'm a composer—so are you.'"

Boury's devotion toward teaching and being a resident composer can be seen just by talking to him. Boury says that he loves to teach and explains, "The teaching philosophy is my message whether children, adults, hospital patients, university students bother general education students and music majors and minors...."

Compositions

Piano
Boury comments that he was in love with his first instrument, piano by age thirteen. Although his piano solo works constitute a substantially few number within his overall output, his piano pieces illustrate an interesting diversity of style tendencies in his music.
 WoO 1 Sonata for Piano (1965)
 WoO 4 Fantasy, Ostinato and Fugue for Piano (1968)
 Op. 1 Blues, Rags and Stomps (1970–1973), Book I & II
 Op. 2a Suite for Piano (1974)
 Op. 3 Hats'n Horns (1974)
 Op. 4 Two Beguines (1975) for two pianos, four hands
 Op. 10d Duelin' Pianos (1973) for two pianos, four hands
 Op. 15 Beautiful Ohio (1980)
 Op. 19 The Mice Will Play (1981) for one piano, eight hands
 Op. 20 Portrait of Chopin (1985)
 Op. 53 Sonatina (2000)
 Op. 60 12 Secret Designs for Piano (2006)
 Op. 61 Three Poetics (2006)
 Op. 62 Cherokee Months (2007)
 Op. 63 Three Lost Waltzes (2008)
 Op. 64 From Dictionary of Angels (2009)

Vocal
 WoO 2 Four Songs on Death (1966) for mezzo-soprano and piano
 WoO 3 Three Serious Songs (1967) for soprano and piano
 Op. 5 American Names (1979) for voice and piano, Song cycle
 Op. 6 Trying to Pray (1980) for voice and piano, Song cycle
 Op. 7 Thirteen Ways of Looking at a Blackbird (1980) for voice, narrator, wood wind and piano, Song cycle.
 Op. 8 The Branch Will Not Break (1981) for voice and piano, Song cycle
 Op. 9 Nonsense Songs (1983) for voice and piano
 Op. 11 A Field Guide to the Birds (1983) for voice and piano, Song cycle
 Op. 12 Flower Songs (1983) for voice and piano
 Op. 17 Five Love Songs (1984) for voice and piano
 Op. 18 Two Prayers (1984) for voice
 Op. 23 Just Before Dawn (1985) for voice, cello and piano, Song cycle
 Op. 24 Two Peace Songs (1985) for voice and piano
 Op. 25 Spring Songs (1985) for voice and piano/guitar
 Op. 26 Song of the Silver Pine (1986) for voice and piano
 Op. 26a Song of the Silver Pine (1986) for voice, clarinet, strings and piano
 Op. 27 A Bowlful of Rhinos (1985) for voice and piano, Song cycle
 Op. 28 Two Love Songs (1985) for voice, flute, clarinet and piano
 Op. 29 The American Sublime (1987) for voice and piano, Song cycle
 Op. 30 Sleeping in the Forest (1987) for voice and piano, Song cycle
 Op. 31 The Region November (1987) for voice and piano, Song cycle
 Op. 32 Carnations (1988) for voice and piano, Song cycle
 Op. 33  In the Midst of Winter (1988) for voice and piano, Song cycle
 Op. 34 Elegies (1980–90) for voice and piano
 Op. 40 November by the Sea (1991) for voice and piano, Song cycle
 Op. 44 Three Love Songs (1996) for baritone and piano
 Op. 46 New Folk Songs (1998) for soprano and piano/guitar, Collection of songs
 Op. 47 The Tree of Night (1998) for voice and piano, Two songs
 Op. 49 Chinese Songs (1998) for mezzo-soprano and piano, Three songs
 Op. 50 Three Wishes (1999) for soprano and piano, Three songs
 Op. 56 To Dream Again (2002) for soprano and piano, Song cycle
 Op. 57 Domination of Black (2003) for mezzo-soprano and piano, Song cycle
 Op. 58 Of History and Hope (2004) for mezzo-soprano, choir and piano, Song cycle
 Op. 59 Nativity Songs (2009) for soprano and piano, Song cycle

Choral
 Op. 3a The Mathematician (1986) for children choir and narrator
 Op. 13 Good Friday Cantata (1984) for SATB, soprano and tenor solos with piano/organ accompaniment
 Op. 13a Three Sacred Pieces (1984) for SATB with piano/organ accompaniment
 Op. 14 American Madrigals (1980–4) for women's chorus, guitar, oboe with piano/harp accompaniment
 Op. 38 Motets (1990) for unaccompanied SATB chorus
 Op. 43 For the Governor (1992) for unaccompanied chorus, Three hymns

Opera
 Op. 35 Bowl, Cat, Broomstick (1988), 1 act
 Op. 37 Cedar Tree and River-water (1990), 1 act
 Op. 42 Maggie (1991), Ragtime musical

Orchestral
 WoO 5 Concerto for Cello and Orchestra (1967)
 WoO 7 Summer Music (1968)
 WoO 9 Grylli (1971)
 WoO 10 The Alligator Bride (1972)
 Op. 2 A Toy Symphony (1974)
 Op. 10 Frontier Overture (1976)
 Op. 10a Folk Symphony (1983)
 Op. 10b Folk Symphony (1984), string orchestra
 Op. 15a Three Pastorales (1980) English horn and string orchestra

Chamber and instrumental
 WoO 6a Sonata for Solo Cello (1968)
 WoO 6b Sonata for Two Cellos (1968)
 WoO 11 Migration (1986) for flute, oboe and piano
 Op. 7a Ten Bagatelles (Butterflies of North America) (1988) for saxophone quartet Score: Encora Music Press
 Op. 7b Ten Bagatelles (Butterflies of North America) (1988) for woodwind quintet
 Op. 10c String Quartet (1984)
 Op. 15 Beautiful Ohio (1980) for English horn and string quartet
 Op. 15b Fantasia and Mimesis (1985) for cello and ensemble
 Op. 16 Piano Trio (1983) for piano, violin and cello
 Op. 16a Duo (1983) for flute and piano
 Op. 21 Celebrations (1981) for brass ensemble
 Op. 22 Ballade (1985) for cello/tenor saxophone and piano, Score: Encord Publications, 1995. Recording: Gasparo (GSCD-274), 1989.
 Op. 36 Country Caprices (1988) for two violas
 Op. 36a Country Caprices (1988) for two violins
 Op. 36b Country Caprices (1988) for two cellos
 Op. 36c Country Caprices (1988) for bassoon and cello
 Op. 36d Country Caprices (1988) for oboe and violin
 Op. 39 Two Blues (1970–1986) for violin and piano
 Op. 45a Poem (1988) for flute and piano
 Op. 45b Poem (1988) for flute, oboe and piano
 Op. 45c Poem (1988) for cello and piano
 Op. 45d Poem (1988) for tenor saxophone and piano
 Op. 48 Hymns to the Night (1998) for narrator and piano trio
 Op. 51 Lives of the Great Butterflies (1999) for two alto recorders and tenor recorder
 Op. 55a Ballade No. 2 (2001) for trumpet, oboe and piano
 Op. 55b Sonata-Ballade (2002) for cello and piano

Electroacoustic
 WoO 8 Honk for Piano and Tape (1970)

Notes

References

American male classical composers
American classical composers
American classical pianists
Male classical pianists
American male pianists
20th-century classical composers
University of Arkansas at Little Rock faculty
21st-century classical composers
1946 births
Living people
University of Michigan School of Music, Theatre & Dance alumni
Pupils of David Diamond (composer)
21st-century American composers
20th-century American composers
20th-century American pianists
21st-century classical pianists
20th-century American male musicians
21st-century American male musicians
21st-century American pianists